The Fortunate Fool is a 1933 British comedy film directed by Norman Walker and starring Hugh Wakefield, Joan Wyndham and Jack Raine.

It was made at Ealing Studios as a quota quickie. The film's sets were designed by the art director Wilfred Shingleton.

Cast
 Hugh Wakefield as Jim Falconer
 Joan Wyndham as Helen
 Jack Raine credited as Jack Raines as Gerald
 Elizabeth Jenns as Mildred
 Arthur Chesney as Batty
 Sara Allgood as Rose
 Bobbie Comber as Marlowe
 Mary Mayfren as Mrs Falconer

References

Bibliography
 Chibnall, Steve. Quota Quickies: The Birth of the British 'B' Film. British Film Institute, 2007.
 Low, Rachael. Filmmaking in 1930s Britain. George Allen & Unwin, 1985.
 Wood, Linda. British Films, 1927-1939. British Film Institute, 1986.

External links

1933 films
1933 comedy films
1930s English-language films
Films directed by Norman Walker
British comedy films
Ealing Studios films
Films set in London
Quota quickies
British black-and-white films
1930s British films